Shanaka is a Sri Lankan name. It may refer to:

Given name
 Shanaka Fernando (born 1968), Sri Lankan-Australian restaurateur
 Shanaka Peters (born 1991), Sri Lankan weightlifter
 Shanaka Sampath (born 1991), Sri Lankan cricketer
 Dasun Shanaka (born 1991), Sri Lankan cricketer

Sinhalese masculine given names